The Ringer is a 1928 British silent crime film directed by Arthur Maude and starring Leslie Faber, Annette Benson and Hayford Hobbs. It was based on the 1925 Edgar Wallace novel The Gaunt Stranger. Scotland Yard hunt for a dangerous criminal who has returned to Britain after many years away. A talkie version of The Ringer followed in 1931.

Cast
 Leslie Faber as Dr. Lamond
 Annette Benson as Cora Ann Milton
 Lawson Butt as Maurice Meister
 Nigel Barrie as Insp. Wembury
 Hayford Hobbs as Insp. Bliss
 John F. Hamilton as John Lenley
 Charles Emerald as Sam Hackett
 Esther Rhodes as Gwenda Milton
 Muriel Angelus as Mary Lenley

See also
 The Ringer (1931)
 The Ringer (1932)
 The Gaunt Stranger (1938)
 The Ringer (1952)
 Der Hexer (1964)

References

External links

1928 films
British crime films
British silent feature films
1928 crime films
Films directed by Arthur Maude
Films based on British novels
Films based on works by Edgar Wallace
Films set in London
British black-and-white films
1920s British films